Persatuan Sepakbola Makassar ( 'Football Association of Makassar') commonly referred to as PSM Makassar, or simply PSM, is an Indonesian professional football club based in Makassar, South Sulawesi that competes in Liga 1. They are also considered one of the most successful clubs in Indonesia, mostly due to their success in the pre-professional era of Indonesian football. In the 2001 season, they became the second Indonesia club side to reach the quarterfinals of an Asia-level tournament in the Asian Club Championship.

History

Foundation and early years (1915–42) 
They are considered the oldest competitive football club in Indonesia and one of the oldest in Southeast Asia. MVB changed its name to  during the 1942-45 Japanese occupation of the Dutch East Indies that forced all organizations with Dutch names to be renamed.

Perserikatan era (1942–94) 
Some of the early players of PSM were regularly called to the Indonesia national football team, the most famous of them was the club legend Ramang. PSM won their first Perserikatan title in 1957 after defeating PSMS Medan. They also managed to win this national amateur championship in 1959, 1965, 1966 and 1992.

Modern era (1994–present) 
After the merger of Perserikatan and Galatama in 1994 that led to the professionalization of teams that once mainly depend on the local government budget, PSM won their first and only Indonesia national professional title in 2000. The squad combined national team players from outside Makassar, such as Miro Baldo Bento, Aji Santoso, Bima Sakti, Kurniawan Dwi Yulianto and Hendro Kartiko, and local talents, such as Ronny Ririn, Syamsudin Batola, Yusrifar Djafar, dan Rachman Usman. They won the 1999–2000 Liga Indonesia Premier Division by only losing 2 from 31 matches.

PSM in 2011 joined the breakaway league Liga Primer Indonesia. They continued to play in the Indonesian Premier League organized by PT Liga Prima Indonesia Sportindo until 2013, before joining the Indonesia Super League again in the 2014 season. In 2021 PSM Makassar sacked Milomir Seslija mainly because of the poor performance PSM Makassar had this year, currently PSM Makaasar is in 12th place in Liga 1 (Indonesia)

Season-by-season records

Key
 Tms. = Number of teams
 Pos. = Position in league

AFC club ranking

Honours

AFC (Asian competitions)
 Asian Club Championship/AFC Champions League
 1996-97 – First round
 2000-01 – Quarter-finals
 2004 – Group stage
 2005 – Group stage
 Asian Cup Winners' Cup
 1997–98– Quarter-finals
 2001-02 – First round
 AFC Cup
 2019 – ASEAN Zona semi-final
 2020 - Cancelled
 2022 – ASEAN Zonal Final

Performance in AFC club competitions

Stadium and facilities 

Home matches were played at the legendary Andi Mattalatta Stadium (also known as Mattoangin), which had a capacity of 15,000 before its demolition on 21 October 2020. The stadium, originally built in 1957 for Pekan Olahraga Nasional IV, was first renovated in 2000 for the 2000–01 Asian Club Championship. Now PSM play their home matches in B.J. Habibie Stadium in Parepare.

Colours and crest
PSM's most popular nickname is Juku Eja (Red Fish), in reference to the red shirt that PSM has used since its foundation and Makassar's reputation as a port city. The common home kit includes a red shirt, red or white shorts, and white socks. The crest is also dominantly red with a traditional Pinisi ship. The away kit of the club is associated with a white or black background. Blue was once adopted as the club's primary colour for their away kit in 2015.

Shirt sponsors and manufacturers

1 Main sponsorship for domestic competitions
2 Main sponsorship for AFC competitions

Supporters

Supporter group 
The most ardent PSM fan clubs are The Maczman and Laskar Ayam Jantan (LAJ).  Other supporter groups include Red Gank, Komunitas VIP Selatan (KVS), Komunitas VIP Utara (KVU), Komunitas Supporter VIP Utama (KSVU). PSM is also supported by people with ethnic or familial links to South Sulawesi province who live across Indonesia due to migration trends, making the club receive support in any Indonesian city with a high concentration of migrants.

Rivalries 
The rivalry with Persija Jakarta is very emotional up to now and can be called the "Red Derby Perserikatan" recalling the Perserikatan era, in which they were the oldest teams using red shirts.  The rivalry did not reach hostile levels before the establishment of Persija's fan club Jakmania.

Players

Current squad

Naturalized players

Out on loan

Personnel

Notable players
This list includes players whom have made significant contributions to the club. Bold indicates players still active in this club.

Domestic players

 Ramang
 Suardi Arlan
 Nursalam
 Ronny Pattinasarany
 Yopie Lumoindong
 Alimuddin Usman
 Ansar Abdullah
 Mukti Ali Raja
 Yusrifar Djafar
 Bahar Muharram
 Rahman Usman
 Ronny Ririn
 Ali Baba
 Syamsuddin Batola
 M. Askar
 Rolly Yasin
 Yeyen Tumena
 Zain Batola
 Bima Sakti
 Aji Santoso
 Hengky Oba
 Kurniawan Dwi Yulianto
 Hendro Kartiko
 Kurnia Sandy
 Budiman Buswir
 Miro Baldo Bento
 Ortizan Solossa
 Jack Komboy
 Hamka Hamzah
 Ponaryo Astaman
 Charis Yulianto
 Irsyad Aras
 Ahmad Amiruddin
 Syamsul Chaeruddin
 Andi Oddang
 Zulkifli Syukur
 Asnawi Mangkualam
 Yakob Sayuri
 Rasyid Bakri
 Yance Sayuri
 Ramadhan Sananta

Foreign players 

AFC
 Goran Subara
 Srećko Mitrović
 Michael Baird
 Reinaldo
 Bruce Djite
 Aaron Evans
 Daryoush Ayyoubi
 Kenzo Nambu
 Bektur Talgat Uulu
 Hussein El Dor
 Kwon Jun
 Joo Ki-hwan
 Park Jung-hwan
 Marwan Sayedeh
 Pavel Purishkin

UEFA
 Josef Nesvačil
 Michal Jířan
 Eero Markkanen
 Lebal Adel
 Steven Paulle
  Ilija Spasojević
 Richard Knopper
 Ronald Hikspoors
  Marc Klok
 Wiljan Pluim
 Leontin Chiţescu
 Claudiu Răducanu
 Nemanja Vučićević
 Roman Chmelo
 Šerif Hasić

CAF
 Charles Lionga
 Fouda Ntsama
 Joseph Lewono
 Herman Abanda
 Jules Basile Onambele
 Yuran Fernandes
 Boman Aimé
  Donald Bissa
 Lamine Diarrassouba
 Saphou Lassy
 Amido Baldé
 Anthony Jommah Ballah
 Musa Kallon
 Ali Khaddafi
 Ouaja Lantame Sakibou
 Nomo Teh Marco

CONMEBOL
 Claudio Pronetto
 Robertino Pugliara
 Marcio Novo
 Luciano Leandro
 Jacksen F. Tiago
  Sandro
 Paulo Martins
 Carlos de Mello
 Everton
 Luiz Ricardo
 Alex da Silva
 David da Rocha
 Giancarlo
 Cristian Carrasco
 Oscar Aravena
 Julio Lopez
 Aldo Barreto
 Osvaldo Moreno
  Cristian Gonzáles
 Ronald Fagundez

Managerial history

See also 
 List of football clubs in Indonesia

References

External links 
  
 
 PSM Makassar at Liga 1 
 PSM Makassar at Eyesoccer Football Database 

 
Football clubs in Indonesia
Football clubs in South Sulawesi
Association football clubs established in 1915
Indonesian Premier Division winners
PSM Makassar